Luo Xi (born 14 September 1969 in Sichuan) is a former Chinese competitor in synchronised swimming. She competed for China in both the women's solo and women's duet competitions at the 1988 Summer Olympics.

References

Living people
Chinese synchronized swimmers
1969 births
Synchronized swimmers from Sichuan
Olympic synchronized swimmers of China
Synchronized swimmers at the 1988 Summer Olympics
Synchronized swimmers at the 1991 World Aquatics Championships